Route 364, also known as Hermitage River Road, is a  north–south highway on the Connaigre Peninsula of the island of Newfoundland. It connects the towns of Seal Cove and Hermitage-Sandyville with Route 360 (Bay d'Espoir Highway).

Route description

Route 364 begins on the coast of Hermitage Bay in Seal Cove, where the road continues west as a gravel road to the former townsites of Grole and Pass Island. It winds its way northeast along the coastline to enter Hermitage-Sandyville, where it passes through Dawson's Cove (Sandyville) before passing through Hermitage, where it has an intersection with Main Street, which provides access to ferries leading to Gaultois and McCallum. The highway travels northeast and farther inland through hilly terrain for several kilometres, where it has an intersection with a local road leading to Furby's Cove. Route 364 continues northeast for several kilometres before coming to an end at an intersection with Route 360. As with most highways in Newfoundland and Labrador, the entire length of Route 364 is a two-lane highway.

Major intersections

References

364